Hypersophtha is a genus of moths of the family Erebidae from Madagascar. The genus was erected by Emilio Berio in 1954.

Species
 Hypersophtha falcata Berio, 1954
 Hypersophtha priscata Viette, 1962

References
 Berio, E. (1954). "Etude de quelques Noctuidae Erastriinae de Madagascar (Lepid. Noctuidae)". Mémoires de l'Institut scientifique de Madagascar. (E) 5 :133–153; pls. 6, 7.

Acontiinae